The 1953 All-Ireland Senior Camogie Championship was the high point of the 1953 season in Camogie. The championship was won by Dublin who defeated Tipperary by a 22-point margin in the final.

Structure
London could not travel to the All Ireland semi-final against Tipperary in Roscrea. No Connacht county entered the championship.

Final
Kathleen Mills had one of her best games, the Nenagh Guardian reported. Her long left handed drives brought about many of Dublin's goals. Dublin hit Tipperary with two goals in the first three minutes, led 5-2 to 0-3 at half time, and scored three more goals early in the second half. Kathleen Griffin’s goal for Tipperary midway through the second half drew a loud cheer from what was described as a “fair sized attendance.”

Final stages

 
MATCH RULES
50 minutes
Replay if scores level
Maximum of 3 substitutions

See also
 All-Ireland Senior Hurling Championship
 Wikipedia List of Camogie players
 National Camogie League
 Camogie All Stars Awards
 Ashbourne Cup

References

External links
 Camogie Association
 Historical reports of All Ireland finals
 All-Ireland Senior Camogie Championship: Roll of Honour
 Camogie on facebook
 Camogie on GAA Oral History Project

1953 in camogie
1953